Albert John Henderson (December 12, 1920 – May 11, 1999) was a United States circuit judge of the United States Court of Appeals for the Fifth Circuit and the United States Court of Appeals for the Eleventh Circuit and earlier was a United States district judge of the United States District Court for the Northern District of Georgia.

Education and career

Born in Canton, Georgia, Henderson was a Sergeant in the United States Army from 1943 to 1945, and then received a Bachelor of Laws from the Walter F. George School of Law at Mercer University in 1947. He was an underwriter for Lawyers Title Insurance Company in Atlanta, Georgia from 1947 to 1948, and was in private practice in Marietta, Georgia from 1948 to 1960. He was a trial attorney of the Assistant State Solicitor General's Office of the Blue Ridge Judicial Circuit from 1949 to 1952. He was a judge of the Juvenile Court of Cobb County, Georgia from 1953 to 1960, and then on the Superior Court of Cobb County from 1961 to 1968.

Federal judicial service

On September 25, 1968, Henderson was nominated by President Lyndon B. Johnson to a seat on the United States District Court for the Northern District of Georgia vacated by Judge Lewis Render Morgan. Henderson was confirmed by the United States Senate on October 10, 1968, and received his commission on October 11, 1968. He served as Chief Judge from 1976 to 1979. His service terminated on July 26, 1979, due to his elevation to the Fifth Circuit.

On April 18, 1979, President Jimmy Carter nominated Henderson to a new seat on the United States Court of Appeals for the Fifth Circuit created by 92 Stat. 1629. He was confirmed by the Senate on July 12, 1979, receiving his commission the following day. On October 1, 1981, Henderson was reassigned by operation of law to the United States Court of Appeals for the Eleventh Circuit. He assumed senior status on January 31, 1986, serving in that capacity until his death, in Marietta.

References

External links 
 

1920 births
1999 deaths
Georgia (U.S. state) state court judges
Judges of the United States District Court for the Northern District of Georgia
United States district court judges appointed by Lyndon B. Johnson
Judges of the United States Court of Appeals for the Fifth Circuit
Judges of the United States Court of Appeals for the Eleventh Circuit
United States court of appeals judges appointed by Jimmy Carter
20th-century American judges
People from Canton, Georgia
People from Marietta, Georgia
20th-century American lawyers
Superior court judges in the United States
United States Army officers
United States Army personnel of World War II